The Remington Model 572 Fieldmaster is a slide action, manually-operated .22 caliber (rimfire) rifle manufactured by Remington Arms Company.  First introduced to the commercial market in 1956, the 572 Fieldmaster rifle incorporates a tubular magazine capable of feeding .22 Short, .22 Long, or .22 Long Rifle rimfire cartridges, a cross-bolt safety, and an aluminum receiver grooved for scope mounts. The original Fieldmaster used a 22.75-inch barrel.  The Model 572 uses many of the design features first introduced on the Remington Model 870 shotgun, and replaced the Model 121 Fieldmaster as the company's slide-action rimfire repeater.

Variants
Model 572A Fieldmaster
Introduced in 1956 as well, the 572A featured a  barrel, an uncheckered hardwood pistol-grip stock and a grooved forearm. It was discontinued in 1988.
Model 572SB
Introduced in 1961 the 572 SmoothBore (Garden Gun) had the same specs as the Model 572A except with a smoothbore barrel. It was discontinued in 1979.
Model 572 BDL
In 1966, Remington introduced the BDL or "Deluxe" rifle to supplement the 572A and 572SB. The BDL featured a ramp front sight with gold bead, a fully adjustable rear sight modeled after the sight used on Remington 700 big-game rifle, and a higher-grade walnut forearm and straight-comb butt stock with impressed checkering. In 1991, the walnut butt stock of the BDL Deluxe version was altered to incorporate a Monte Carlo comb to improve cheek weld when using the rifle with a telescopic sight, and the impressed checkering was altered to machine-cut checkering.  In 2017, after complaints that the high Monte Carlo comb made the rifle difficult to use with open sights, Remington returned to a straight comb butt stock design for current production BDL rifles.  The BDL is the only 572 model currently in production.

References

External links 
 Official Website

Pump-action rifles
Remington Arms firearms
.22 LR rifles